Bankim Sardar College, established in 1955, is an undergraduate college in Tangrakhali, South 24 Parganas, West Bengal, India. It is affiliated with the University of Calcutta.

History 
This college was stablished in 1955 at Tangrakhali village under the Canning subdivision. Since there were no higher educational institutes in the Sundarban locality, a disadvantaged and underprivileged region of the country, the college provides now provides access to education.

Departments

Science
Botany
Zoology
Physics
Chemistry

Arts and Commerce
Bengali
English
History
Sanskrit
Political Science
Philosophy
Economics
Education
Physical Education

Accreditation
The college is recognized by the University Grants Commission (UGC).

See also

References

External links
Bankim Sardar College 
Bankim Sardar College Admission Online

Educational institutions established in 1955
University of Calcutta affiliates
Universities and colleges in South 24 Parganas district
1955 establishments in West Bengal